The First and Second Atkinson Ministries were responsible governments in a period sometimes known as the Continuous Ministry. Harry Atkinson formed a government on 1 September 1876, but as it included 9 salaried ministers rather than the legally mandated 8, the Ministry was forced to resign on 13 September and take office again without John Hall. This second Atkinson ministry survived a full year.

Background
Atkinson took over from the government of Julius Vogel, who recommended him to the Governor on condition that Atkinson appoint him Agent-General in London. Vogel had already sounded out John Davies Ormond, Edward Stafford and William Fitzherbert. Within a fortnight of the installation of the new ministry (which kept on several figures from the previous administrations), it was forced to resign as the Budget only provided for seven Ministers plus a Premier, and Atkinson had appointed eight. The First Atkinson Ministry handed in their resignations on 13 September 1876 and were immediately reappointed with the exception of John Hall, thus becoming officially the Second Atkinson Ministry.

Vogel's Great Public Works policy had run into criticism of the lack of parliamentary oversight of public works contracts and a public debt which had grown from £8 million to £17 million between 1870 and 1875, while export prices were dropping. The Ministry therefore reversed the previous policy and cut back on public works spending except for main trunk lines, which had the impact of losing the votes of land speculators and backblocks Members. To deal with the number of unemployed immigrants unable to afford the inflated price of land, the Government introduced a Waste Lands Act including the ability to purchase land on deferred payment. This was one of the few new policies brought in by a Government whose mission was "political rest combined with financial circumspection".

One of the alienated Members of the House of Representatives was William Larnach, who in October 1877 submitted a motion of no confidence based on the Ministry's paralysis. It has been argued that he was in fact motivated by a desire for a Government which would promote his speculative Waimea Plains Land Company. Larnach's motion succeeded by 42 votes to 38 but Larnach was unable to form a new Ministry, instead recommending that ex-Governor Sir George Grey be called.

Ministers
The following members served in the Atkinson Ministry:

See also
 New Zealand Government

Notes

References

Ministries of Queen Victoria
Governments of New Zealand
19th century in New Zealand
1876 establishments in New Zealand
Cabinets established in 1876
Cabinets disestablished in 1877